The Wolfram Crisis (Spanish: Crisis del wolframio) was a diplomatic conflict during World War II between Francoist Spain and the Allied powers, which sought to block Spanish exports of tungsten ore to Nazi Germany. "Wolfram" is an alternate name for tungsten, a strategic material used in anti-tank weapons and machine tools.

The high demand for this scarce strategic mineral in war time had created a bubble in prices, with the otherwise desolate post-Civil War Spanish economy heftily profiting from it, as its income from tungsten exports had increased from £73,000 in 1940 to £15.7 million in 1943. Tungsten exports accounted for nearly 1% of the Spanish GDP and 20% of its exports by 1943–44. On 18 November 1943, the United States Ambassador to Spain delivered a memorandum to the Spanish Ministry of Foreign Affairs demanding for the unconditional end to tungsten exports to Germany. After the repeated refusal by Spain to comply with the U.S. demand, the United States decreed an embargo on oil supplies to Spain on 28 January 1944. A short time later, additional restriction on Spanish exports of cotton products was enforced, threatening the Catalan textile industry.

On 2 May 1944 a secret deal was signed between Spain, the U.S., and the United Kingdom, in which Spain, in exchange for the reestablishment of oil supplies and a compromise for negotiating future economic concessions, pledged to drastically limit tungsten exports to Germany (a cap of 20 tonnes in May, 20 tonnes in June, and 40 tonnes from then on), to close the German Consulate in Tangiers and expel its members, to prevent any logistic support to Germans in airports, to expel German spies and saboteurs from Spanish soil, to solve a litigation regarding Italian ships trapped in the Balearic Islands, and to recall the last remaining Spanish volunteers on the Eastern Front.

Despite their capitulation, Spanish diplomats sold the deal as a success, as they had negotiated the Allied demand for full termination of tungsten exports to Germany down to a cap on exports to a "symbolic" amount. The U.S., the most uncompromising party in principle, blamed the failure to achieve a complete end to the exports on the British diplomacy, while Winston Churchill kindly commended Spain for its "services" in a late May intervention in the House of Commons.

References

Bibliography 
 
 
 
 
 
 

Economic history of World War II
Spain in World War II
Spain–United States relations
United States in World War II
1944 in Spain
1944 in the United States
1944 in international relations
Diplomatic incidents
Foreign relations of Spain during the Francoist dictatorship